Garnotia is a genus of Asian, Australian, and tropical island plants in the grass family. Several of the species are native to Sri Lanka and southern India.

 Species

 formerly included
see Arundinella Asthenochloa Panicum Phaenosperma

References

Panicoideae
Poaceae genera
Taxa named by Adolphe-Théodore Brongniart